In Sri Lanka, smoking is restricted in many indoor public places, workplaces, and public transport. According to the National Authority on Tobacco and Alcohol Act No. 27 of 2006 (NATA), smoking is prohibited in government departments, office premises, courthouses, libraries, and educational institutions, making these places 100% smoke-free. The law also prohibits smoking in hospitals, clinics, dispensaries, and laboratories, as well as public areas of residential healthcare facilities and non-residential healthcare facilities. Smoking is also prohibited in schools, universities, childcare facilities, and preschools, making these places 100% smoke-free. The law permits the establishment of smoking areas or spaces in airports, hotels having 30 rooms or more, and restaurants having a seating capacity of at least 30 persons. The law prohibits smoking in public conveyances, however, the definition of "public conveyances" is undefined and difficult to determine, so it is interpreted as including all public means of transportation.

Smoking Ban in Public Areas
According to NATA 2006 No. 27 section 39, Smoking is prohibited in enclosed public places, including government departments, offices, hospitals, schools, restaurants, cinemas, and airports, among others. The owners, managers, or persons in charge of these places are responsible for ensuring that no one smokes within them. However, hotels, restaurants, and airports with 30 or more rooms or a seating capacity of at least 30 persons may have designated smoking areas within their premises, as long as they have adequate ventilation and meet air quality standards. Contravening the provisions of this section is an offense that can result in a fine of up to 2,000 Sri Lankan rupees (LKR), imprisonment for up to 1 year, or both. The definition of "public place" in this context refers to any place to which the public has access.

Advertisement ban
According to NATA 2006 No. 27 sections 35 and 36, it is illegal to publish or cause to be published a tobacco or alcohol advertisement in Sri Lanka. This includes a display, insertion in print materials, transmission, and broadcast of advertisements. Exceptions include the display of brand names or trademarks on products or packages, notice of product availability and prices inside stores, and scientific, educational, social, medical, or technical information about the products. Contravening this law can result in a fine of up to two million LKR. The definitions of "tobacco advertisement" and "alcohol advertisement" include any material that promotes smoking or drinking, respectively.

References

Smoking by country
Smoking cessation
Health in Sri Lanka